Dolichophis is a genus of snakes of the family Colubridae.

Geographic range
Species in the genus Dolichophis are found in Southeast Europe and the Middle East.

Species
Four species are recognized as being valid.

Nota bene: A binomial authority in parentheses indicates that the species was originally described in a genus other than Dolicophis.

References

 
Taxa named by Johannes von Nepomuk Franz Xaver Gistel